The Ministry of Medium Machine-Building Industry of the USSR (also known as Sredmash) was the government ministry of the Soviet Union that supervised the Soviet nuclear industry, including production of nuclear warheads. The headquarters was located in Moscow in the building at Bolshaya Ordynka St. (Большая Ордынка) 24-26, currently occupied by the corporation Rosatom.

History
The basis of the ministry was established since September 1942  the First Chief Directorate (nuclear industry), the Third Chief Directorate (development in the area controlled missiles, aircraft, rockets and long range missiles) of the Council of Ministers of the USSR and the Central Board of Industrial Building of the Ministry of Internal Affairs of the USSR (Главпромстрой МВД) charged with construction of nuclear installations.

The Ministry of Medium Machine Building was established by Decree of the Presidium of the Supreme Soviet of 26 June 1953. The Central Intelligence Agency initially believed that the ministry oversaw the war industry. On September 11, 1989, following the merge with the Ministry of Atomic Energy, the Ministry of Medium Machine Building was renamed into the Ministry of Atomic Energy and Industry of the USSR  (Министерство атомной энергетики и промышленности СССР).

List of ministers
Source:
 Vyacheslav Malyshev (17.7.1953 - 28.2.1955)
 Avraami Zavenyagin (28.2.1955 - 21.1.1956)
 Nikolai Smelyakov (21.1.1956 - 10.5.1957) (acting)
 Mikhail Pervukhin (10.5.1957 - 24.7.1957)
 Efim Slavsky (24.7.1957 - 22.11.1986)
 Lev Ryabev (22.11.1986 - 17.7.1989)
 Oleg Shishkin (17.7.1989 - 25.12.1991)

See also
Ministry of General Machine Building, Soviet ministry of space industry

References

External links
Age of sredmash
 

 
Nuclear weapons program of the Soviet Union
1953 establishments in the Soviet Union
Ministries established in 1953
Nuclear technology in the Soviet Union